Frankensteins and Gumdrops is a comedy EP by Patton Oswalt. It was released in 2008, and was only obtainable by a $75 donation to WFMU via The Best Show on WFMU.

Track listing
There Will Be Blood – 2:31
Mega-Leg – 7:47

References

2008 EPs
Patton Oswalt albums
Comedy EPs